Mary Flores may refer to:

 Mary Barzee Flores (born 1962), Florida attorney
 Mary Elizabeth Flores (born 1973), Honduran lawyer, politician and diplomat